Louis-Emmanuel Jadin (21 September 1768 – 11 April 1853) was a French composer, pianist and harpsichordist.

Jadin was born in Versailles.  He learned piano from his brother Hyacinthe Jadin and later worked at the Théâtre de Monsieur. His first opera was staged in Versailles in 1788. The following year he took the position of second keyboardist at the Théâtre de Monsieur. In 1792 he became a musician in the National Guard. In 1802 he acted as a professor of music and in 1806 was director of the Théâtre Molière. He later won fame as a pianist and taught at the Paris Conservatory. He was made Chevalier of the Légion d’honneur in 1824. Many of his works were published in Paris, where he died. The playwright and chansonnier Adolphe Jadin was his son.

Selected works

Operas

1788 Guerre ouverte ou Ruse contre ruse 3 Acts
1790 Constance et Gernand 1 Act
1790 Joconde after Jean de La Fontaine 3 Acts
1790 La religieuse danoise ou La communauté de Copenhague 3 Acts (also called Le Duce de Waldeza)
1791 La vengeance du bailli ou La suite d'Annette et Lubin 2 Acts
1791 L'heureux stratagème 2 Acts
1792 Amélie de Monfort 3 Acts
1792 L'avare puni 1 Act
1793 Les talismans 3 Acts
1793 Le coin de feu 1 Act
1793 Le siège de Thionville 2 Acts
1794 Le congrès des rois 3 Acts (a collaboration by 12 composers)
1794 Alisbelle ou Les crimes de la féodalité 3 Acts
1794 L'apothéose du jeune Barra 1 Act
1794 Agricol Viala ou Le jeune héros de la durance 1 Act
1794 L'ecolier en vacances 1 Act
1795 Le cabaleur 1 Act
1795 Le lendemain de noces 1 Act
1795 Loizerolles ou L'héroïsme paternel 1 Act
1796 Le mariage de la veille 1 Act
1796 Mélusine et Gerval (Méline et Ferval)
1796 Le négociant de Boston 1 Act
1796 Les deux Lettres 1 Act
1796 Le défi hasardeux 2 Acts
1797 Les bons voisins 1 Act
1798 Candos ou Les sauvages du Canada 3 Acts
1798 La paix ou Le triomphe de l'humanité 
1803 Mahomet II 3 Acts
1804 Jean Bart et Patoulet 1 Act
1804 Mon cousin de Paris 1 Act
1804 La grand-mère 2 Acts
1805 Les trois prétendus 1 Act
1805 Le grand-père ou Les deux ages 1 Act
1805 Charles Coypel ou La vengeance d'un peintre 1 Act
1806 Les deux aveugles de Tolède 1 Act
1807 Les arts et l'amitié
1810 La partie de campagne 1 Act
1812 L'auteur malgré lui ou La pièce tombée 1 Act
1816 L'inconnu ou Le coup d'épée viager 3 Acts
1817 La gueule du lion ou La mère esclave 3 Acts
1822 Fanfan et Colas ou Les frères de lait 1 Act
Jean et Geneviève (unperformed)

Orchestral
Fantaisie concertante in g for Harp, Piano, and Orchestra
 Allegro risoluto
 Adagio
 Allegro moderato
4th Piano concerto in D minor (1810)
Allegro maestoso
Siciliano. Larghetto
Finale. Chasse
Symphonie concertante for Clarinet, Horn, Bassoon and Orchestra (1803)

Concert Band
Marche en F (1794)
Ouverture en C (1794)
Pas de manoeuvre en F (1794)
Symphonie en F (1794)
Suites d’harmonies militaires

Mass
Requiem for 3 solo voices, 3 trombones, and double-bass

Chamber music
Sonate en ré Majeur for harpsichord with flute obligéeSonate en sol majeur opus X n° 3 for harpsichord or piano-forte, flute, and bassSonate en sol majeur opus XIII n° 1 for piano-forte, flûte et basseSonate en sol majeur for harpsichord or piano-forte with flute accompagnement 4 Arien for Horn and HarpDuo for Harp and PianoTrois grands quatuors for two violons, alto, and violoncelleMedia

References

Fend/Noiray, "Louis-Emmanuel Jadin". The New Grove Dictionary of Opera'' online.

External links

1768 births
1853 deaths
French male classical composers
French opera composers
Male opera composers
French Classical-period composers
French harpsichordists
French conductors (music)
French male conductors (music)
French music educators
People from Versailles
Academic staff of the Conservatoire de Paris
Chevaliers of the Légion d'honneur
18th-century keyboardists
19th-century French male musicians